A frozen alcoholic drink, also called an alcoholic slushy, is a type of slushy made with alcohol. The alcoholic and non-alcoholic ingredients are processed in a blender to create a slush texture.

Types 

There are several types of frozen alcoholic drink made from various cocktails. Some of these include:
 Frozen daiquiri
 Frozen Mai Tai
 Frozen margarita
 Frozen screwdriver
 Phrostie
 Tequila slushie

References

Frozen drinks
Alcoholic drinks